Sneffels was a town in Ouray County, Colorado, United States named after Mount Sneffels.

History

Mining era
Sneffels was founded in 1875 and named after the mountain it was built on. The town peaked at 2000 people and grew largely between the mid-1880s until 1891.
The Revenue Mill at Sneffels processed ore from the Virginius and other mines nearby. The mill complex employed around 600 men at its peak.

Modern day
Today there are scattered remnants and a few nearby residents.

See also

 List of ghost towns in Colorado

References

External links

 Sneffels Ghost Town Information and Photos

Ghost towns in Colorado
Former populated places in Ouray County, Colorado